Quentin Townsend (born 13 February 1977) is an English former footballer who played as a centre back. He played in the Football League for Hereford United.

Career
Townsend began his career as a trainee with Wolverhampton Wanderers, but despite signing professional terms with the club never played a first team match for the club.

He moved to Third Division Hereford United in Summer 1996 on a free transfer, where he reunited with his former Wolves manager Graham Turner.

The defender made his senior debut on 17 August 1996 in a 0–1 defeat at Fulham, and went on to make ten appearances in total for the club in the football league . At the end of the season the team suffered relegation from the Football League and Townsend was released.

After leaving Hereford, Townsend signed for his hometown club Worcester City, before having a good semi pro career representing a number of non-league clubs in the Midlands.

He now manages Stourport Swift’s Fc in the Midland Premier Division.

References

External links

The Hereford United Archives

1977 births
Living people
Sportspeople from Worcester, England
English footballers
Wolverhampton Wanderers F.C. players
Hereford United F.C. players
Worcester City F.C. players
English Football League players
Association football central defenders